KKIK (106.5 FM, "Outlaw Country 106.5") is a radio station broadcasting a country music format. Licensed to Horseshoe Bend, Arkansas, United States, the station is currently owned by WRD Entertainment, Inc. KKIK's sister station is KAAB in Batesville, Arkansas.

References

External links

KIK
Country radio stations in the United States
Izard County, Arkansas
Radio stations established in 2004
2004 establishments in Arkansas